Belogorovka may refer to:

 , a village in the Rostov Oblast in Russia
 , a village in the Ulyanovsk Oblast in Russia

See also 
 Bilohorivka, the name of several villages in Ukraine known in Russian as Belogorovka

Set index articles on populated places in Russia